Brosna Gaels GAA is a Gaelic Athletic Association club located in the parish of Leamonaghan, which includes Ballycumber, Doon and Pullough, in County Offaly, Ireland. The club is exclusively concerned with the game of hurling.

Honours

 Offaly Intermediate Hurling Championship (2): 2009, 2011
 Offaly Junior A Hurling Championship (1): 2007, 2021
 Offaly Junior B Hurling Championship (2): 2005, 2010

Notable players

External links
 History of Brosna Gaels GAA

Gaelic games clubs in County Offaly
Hurling clubs in County Offaly